The 1966–67 IHL season was the 22nd season of the International Hockey League, a North American minor professional league. Six teams participated in the regular season, and the Toledo Blades won the Turner Cup.

Regular season

Turner Cup-Playoffs

External links
 Season 1966/67 on hockeydb.com

IHL
International Hockey League (1945–2001) seasons